The Southern Annamites montane rain forests ecoregion (WWF ID: IM0152) covers a region of high biodiversity in the central and southern mountains of the Annamite Range in Vietnam.  Terrain ranges from wet lowland forest to evergreen hardwood and conifer montane rain forest.  There is a short dry season centered on January–February, but fog and dew are common throughout the year and support a lush forest character.

Location and description 

There are two general areas. One in the central highlands straddling central Vietnam and southern Laos northeast of the Bolaven Plateau. The southern sector is built more on weathered basalt, which creates fertile soil for agriculture.

Climate 
The climate of the ecoregion is Tropical savanna climate - dry winter (Köppen climate classification (Aw)).  This climate is characterized by relatively even temperatures throughout the year, and a pronounced dry season.  The driest month has less than 60 mm of precipitation, and is drier than the average month.  In this ecoregion, annual precipitation is 1,800-2,000 mm in the Annamites and in the western regions of the Da Lat Plateau, but can reach over 3,000 mm/year on the eastern edge of the Da Lat Plateau.

Flora and fauna 
The region is about 75% forested.  Most of this is a closed forest of broadleaf evergreens, and some needle-leaf evergreen.   Wet evergreen forest cover from 600 to 900 meters elevation is characterized by species of Fagaceae, Myrtaceae, and Lauraceae.  Above 900 meters, the wet hardwood forest supports a wide variety of tree species, generally dependent on the geology and soil of the location.  The canopy of about 30 meters is lower at higher elevations and with thinner soils.  Epiphytes are a common feature of these forests. Khasi pine (Pinus kesiya) is common throughout the region at elevations up to 1,800 meters.

Protected areas 
About 11% of the ecoregion is protected in some official capacity, including:
 Núi Chúa National Park reaches down to the South China Sea in southeast Vietnam, with Nui Chua peak reaching 1,032 meters.  It is a relatively intact ecosystem.
 Bạch Mã National Park includes a former colonial hill station above central coastal city of Huế.
 Kon Ka Kinh National Park covers a biodiverse region in the central highlands of Vietnam, and protects upstream areas of the Ba River.
 Chư Yang Sin National Park is located in Đắk Lắk Province in the central highlands of Vietnam.

References 

Indomalayan ecoregions
Ecoregions of Vietnam
Ecoregions of Laos
Tropical and subtropical moist broadleaf forests
Montane forests